Versão Acústica 2 is the second album by Brazilian Acoustic rock musician Emmerson Nogueira. It features covers of hits from many famous bands and musicians, such as Sting, Elton John, Bob Dylan, and Seal.

Track listing

Personnel 
Emmerson Nogueira - Lead vocals, backing vocals, Acoustic guitar, Twelve string guitar, Lap steel guitar, Bass guitar
Zé Mario - drums
Vanessa Farias - Lead Vocals, backing vocals
Sarah Furtado - Vocals
Luciano Mendonça – Bass guitar
Marcoz Falcão – 12 string guitar, Acoustic guitar
Joni Lammas – Transverse flute
Oscar Henriques - Vocals

2002 albums
Covers albums
Emmerson Nogueira albums